Hereford is an unincorporated community and a U.S. Post Office in Weld County, Colorado, United States.  The Hereford Post Office has the ZIP Code 80732.

Geography
Hereford is located at  (40.974973,-104.305401).

References

Unincorporated communities in Weld County, Colorado
Unincorporated communities in Colorado